Soccer dog may refer to:

Soccer Dog: The Movie
Its sequel, Soccer Dog: European Cup
Soccer (dog) -  A dog-actor named Soccer